Le bar du téléphone is a 1980 French film directed by Claude Barrois.

Cast and roles
 Daniel Duval - Toni Véronèse
 François Périer - Commissaire Claude Joinville
 Raymond Pellegrin - Robert Pérez
 Julien Guiomar - Antoine Bini
 Georges Wilson - Léopold Kretzchman
 Valentine Monnier - Maria
 Christopher Lambert - Paul 'Bébé' Franchi (credited as Christophe Lambert)
 Richard Anconina - Boum-Boum
 Patrick Laurent - Matelot
 Marc-Michel Bruyat - Barjol
 Philippe Brigaud - Samuel Pérez
 Henri Viscogliosi - Bernard Pérez
 Guy Régent - Henri Perez
 Jacques Ferrière - Max
 Pierre Julien - Petit Jeannot

External links
 IMDb entry

1980s crime thriller films
French gangster films
1980 films
French neo-noir films
Films scored by Vladimir Cosma
1980s French films